Roger Davies, also known as Roger Davies-Roberts, is a British television and film actor. He is best known for playing the character Vinnie Rodriguez in the Nickelodeon UK series Renford Rejects, which ran from 1998 to 2001. In 2018, he featured in Netflix/Bad Robot's The Cloverfield Paradox playing Michael Hamilton.

Davies has also appeared in a number of TV series including 24seven, Hounded, The Bill, Blue Peter, Family Affairs, Dream Team, Girls in Love, and NCIS: Los Angeles.

References

External links 

20th-century English male actors
21st-century English male actors
Living people
Year of birth missing (living people)